The 82nd Airborne Division War Memorial Museum is a museum located at Ardennes and Gela Streets on the Fort Bragg Army base.  Established in 1945, the museum  chronicles the history of the 82nd Airborne Division from 1917 to the present including World War I, World War II, Vietnam War, and Persian Gulf Wars as well as campaigns in Grenada, Panama, Operation Golden Pheasant, Operation Restore Hope and Operation Enduring Freedom.  The museum is open to the public but photo id and a vehicle search is required to enter Fort Bragg.

The museum grounds serve as a location for military ceremonies as well.

Exhibits
The collection includes light armor weapons, rifles, handguns, and uniforms from multiple eras including captured arms and uniforms of enemy forces including German paratrooper and Luftwaffe.  Personal items including a name tag and military uniform belonging to Manuel Noriega, captured during Operation Just Cause.

Aircraft

 Fairchild C-119 Flying Boxcar
 Douglas C-47 Skytrain
 de Havilland Canada C-7 Caribou
 Bell UH-1A Iroquois
 Curtiss C-46F Commando
 Fairchild C-123K Provider

Ground Vehicles
 M551 Sheridan
 M56 Scorpion

References 
 82d Airborne Division War memorial museum, In-Briefing to AA6 dated May 2014

External links

 Official Website

Aerospace museums in North Carolina
Military and war museums in North Carolina
Museums in Cumberland County, North Carolina
Hoke County, North Carolina
Fayetteville, North Carolina metropolitan area
Museums established in 1945
United States Army museums
1945 establishments in North Carolina